Infralec was a short-lived electricity distribution subsidiary in the United Kingdom. Infralec was established in February 2000 by Hyder to operate the Welsh electricity distribution network previously operated under the SWALEC brand, when the rest of Hyder was sold to British Energy.

In 2001, Hyder was purchased by Western Power Distribution who sold off most parts of the organisation but kept Infralec, which was rebranded as WPD South Wales.

References

Electric power companies of the United Kingdom
Energy in Wales
Defunct companies of the United Kingdom
Energy companies established in 2000
Technology companies disestablished in 2001